KAWS or Kaws may refer to:

 KAWS (FM), a radio station (89.1 FM) licensed to Marsing, Idaho, United States, broadcasting the Christian Satellite Network (CSN) International
 KZJB (90.3 FM), a radio station serving Pocatello, Idaho, United States, that had the call letters KAWS from 1998 to 2005
 Kaws (born 1974 as Brian Donnelly), graffiti artist, clothing and toy designer
 Topeka Kaws, an American minor league baseball team in the third iteration of the Southwestern League
 Kaw people, a federally recognized Native American tribe